A cystoprostatectomy is a surgical procedure in which the urinary bladder and prostate gland are removed. The procedure combines a cystectomy and a prostatectomy.

See also 
 List of surgeries by type

References

Surgical oncology
Surgical removal procedures
Male genital surgery
Prostatic procedures